Brenda Bence is an American author, senior executive coach, professional speaker and leadership branding expert.

Bence has authored several books on leadership branding and executive coaching, including Leading YOU, Would YOU Want to Work for YOU?, Master the Brand Called YOU, Smarter Branding Without Breaking the Bank, and the How YOU are Like Shampoo personal branding book series.

Bence is a member of the Global Speakers Federation and the Asia Professional Speakers Association where she holds the highest earned distinction of CSPGlobal and Certified Speaking Professional (CSP), respectively. She is also a member of the International Coach Federation. She has been featured by national media outlets such as Financial Times, LA Times, The Street.com, Kiplinger's Finance Newsletter, Smart Money, Investor's Business Daily, Women Entrepreneur, Affluent, Par Excellence, Personal Excellence, and Leadership Excellence among others.

She is the President of Brenda Bence International which she started in 2002. Prior to starting her own business, Bence worked at Procter & Gamble (P&G) in the USA, Europe, and Asia, and at Mead Johnson Nutrition (then a Bristol-Myers Squibb company) as Vice President of International Marketing, where she was responsible for the branding and marketing strategy across 46 countries and four continents, representing all of the markets outside the USA.

References

External links 
 

Living people
American motivational speakers
Women motivational speakers
Harvard Business School alumni
Nebraska Wesleyan University alumni
Year of birth missing (living people)